Polina Trifonova (born 24 January 1992 Kubrat) is a Bulgarian-Ukrainian  table tennis player. She competed at the 2020 Summer Olympic Games in Tokyo, and is now ranked 33.

Career 
She was 2010 and 2012 Ukrainian Table Tennis Champion. She was 2020 Bulgarian Table Tennis Champion.

She qualified for the 2020 Summer Olympics, by the European Tournament.

References 

1992 births
Living people
People from Kubrat (town)
Bulgarian female table tennis players
Ukrainian female table tennis players
Olympic table tennis players of Bulgaria
Table tennis players at the 2020 Summer Olympics